Discourse on Colonialism is an essay by Aimé Césaire, a poet and politician from Martinique who helped found the négritude movement in Francophone literature. Césaire first published the essay in 1950 in Paris with Éditions Réclame, a small publisher associated with the French Communist Party (PCF). Five years later, he then edited and republished it with the anticolonial publisher Présence africaine (Paris and Dakar). The 1955 edition is the one with the widest circulation today, and it serves as a foundational text of postcolonial literature that discusses what Césaire described as the appalling affair of the European civilizing mission. Rather than elevating the non-Western world, the colonizers de-civilize the colonized.

Argument 
Césaire's Discourse on Colonialism argues that colonialism was not and had never been a benevolent movement whose goal was to improve the lives of the colonized; instead, colonists' motives were entirely self-centered, economic exploitation. According to Césaire, by establishing colonies and then exploiting them, the European colonial powers have created two main problems: the problem of the proletariat and the colonial problem. In describing the colonial problem that European civilization has created, he calls Europe "indefensible", whose colonizers cannot be misconstrued as positive. Césaire discusses the relationship between civilization and savagery and points out the hypocrisy of colonialism. He asserts that it is ironic that colonizers hoped to rid the countries they colonized of “savages” but in reality, by killing, raping, and destroying the land in which those “savages” lived on, they were themselves savages. His interpretation flips the common narrative, in order to point out the autonomy that existed in colonizing foreign lands.

He bases his argument on the claim that, "no one colonizes innocently, that no one colonizes with impunity either; that a nation which colonizes, that a civilization which justifies colonization—and therefore force—is already a sick civilization, a civilization which is morally diseased, which irresistibly, progressing from one consequence to another, one denial to another, calls for its Hitler, I mean its punishment". He labels the colonizers as barbaric for their treatment of those in the colonies. He defines the relationship as one limited to "forced labor, intimidation, pressure, the police, taxation, theft, rape, compulsory crops, contempt, mistrust, arrogance, self-complacency, swinishness, brainless elites, degraded masses".

In addition, Césaire also acknowledges the racial construction of the relationship. By identifying the colonial relationship as one based on race, he draws comparisons between his home of Martinique with the colonies in Africa. By equating racism, barbarism and colonialism, he claims colonization to be a form of dehumanization that results from Europe's racism against black populations in Africa and the Caribbean. He writes that Hitler differed in the eyes of the Europeans because he "applied to Europe colonialist procedures which until then had been reserved exclusively for the Arabs of Algeria, the 'coolies' of India and the 'niggers' of Africa", meaning that, by persecuting white Europeans, Hitler produced violence most commonly reserved for non-white populations, arguing: "they tolerated that Nazism before it was inflicted on them, they absolved it, shut their eyes to it, legitimized it, because, until then, it had been applied only to non-European peoples."

Marxist theory
Césaire criticized the "humanist" interpretation of colonialism because it continued to deny the humanity of the colonized peoples—the very antithesis of humanism, which emphasizes the value and agency of human beings. Additionally, he referred to Marxist theory and criticized the "bourgeois, capitalistic European culture and said that capitalism would always disintegrate into Nazism". The most notable allusion to Marxism appears towards the end of the text when he writes, "it is a new society that we must create, with the help of all our brother slaves, a society rich with all the productive power of modern times, warm with all the fraternity of olden days. For some examples showing that this is possible, we can look to the Soviet Union".

Style 
Césaire wrote his book in a poetic style, discussing the negative effects of colonization on colonies. He writes in poetic prose as, "a method of achieving clairvoyance, of obtaining the knowledge we need to move forward". His unique style of writing sets him apart from other postcolonial academics who published works alongside him at the same time.

Reception 
Due to its "harsh tone and radical statements", the essay has been compared to "a declaration of war" on colonialism.

Discourse added to the themes developed in his 1939 poem Cahier d'un retour au pays natal ("Notebook of a Return to the Native Land"), which he wrote in response to leaving France and returning to Martinique. In , Césaire notes the relationship between Martinique and his African heritage, confirming this bond between colonies in Africa and colonies elsewhere as one based on race. In identifying the racism problem associated with the colonial relationship, he claims that Adolf Hitler and the Nazi Party's persecution of Jews during World War II and the Holocaust was not an aberration, but rather the norm in Europe.

See also
 Civilizing mission
 Eurocentrism

References

1955 non-fiction books
Works by Aimé Césaire
French non-fiction books
History books about colonialism